William Jefferson may refer to:

 William Jefferson (actor) (1876–1946), American stage and film actor
 William J. Jefferson (born 1947), former Louisiana Democratic congressman
 Will Jefferson (born 1979), English cricketer
 William Jefferson (United Nations employee) (1951–1995), killed serving in Bosnia in the 1990s
 Bill Jefferson (baseball) (1904–1976), American baseball pitcher

See also
 William Jefferson Clinton, full name of former U.S. President Bill Clinton (born 1946)